The Idaho State Bengals are the varsity intercollegiate athletic teams representing Idaho State University, located in Pocatello, Idaho. The university sponsors thirteen teams including men and women's basketball, cross country, tennis, and track and field; women's-only golf, soccer, softball, and volleyball; and men's-only football. The Bengals compete at the National Collegiate Athletic Association (NCAA) Division I level (Football Championship Subdivision (FCS) for college football) and are currently a member institution of the Big Sky Conference. The Bengals' in-state athletic rivals are the University of Idaho Vandals (located in Moscow).

Teams

Football

In the 2009 campaign, Idaho State's football team boasted a one win record, which wasn't an improvement over the 2008 campaign.  ISU football's last winning season was the 2018 campaign when they posted a record of 6–5. Previously they had not had a season above .500 since the 2014 campaign (8–4).

In October 2009 Idaho State University Director of Athletics Jeff Tingey announced that the contract of head football coach John Zamberlin would be extended for two more years, meaning Zamberin was on the Bengals sidelines manning the program through the 2011 season.

Hired in late December 2006, Zamberlin's record at ISU is just 4–25. The decision has been highly criticized by many students, faculty, and community members. The administration have stood by their decision, citing an increase in athlete attendance in classes and graduation rates as a direct result of Zamberlin's coaching.

In 2010, the Bengals went 1–10 overall and 0–8 in the Big Sky Conference. Zamberlin was fired and former Eastern Washington and Montana State coach, Mike Kramer, was hired.

Idaho State used to enjoy healthy rivalries with both the University of Idaho and Boise State University when all three schools were members of the Big Sky Conference. When both Idaho and BSU left the Big Sky in 1996 to move up to Division I-A, Idaho State University lost their main rivals, and Weber State of nearby Ogden, Utah became Idaho State's main rival. However, Idaho did move back down to Division 1-AA in 2018, resparking the rivalry between the two schools. Since 2018, they played an annual rivalry game nicknamed Battle of the Domes. Idaho State has won 2 out of the 4 games under the Battle of the Domes branding.

Basketball

In March 1977, the men's basketball team made national headlines by defeating the UCLA Bruins 76–75 in the West regional semifinal of that year's NCAA tournament. The win qualified the Bengals for their only appearance to date in the Elite Eight. This is by far the high-water mark for Bengals basketball, and marked the first time since 1966 that UCLA failed to reach the Final Four. The Bengals were subsequently eliminated in the West regional final by the UNLV Runnin' Rebels.

The men's basketball team plays their home games at Holt Arena, with a seating capacity of 8,000 for basketball. Their most recent appearance in the NCAA tournament was in 1987, when ISU was eliminated 70–95 in the first round by top-ranked UNLV.

Women's basketball

ISU's women's basketball team plays their home games at Reed Gym, which has a seating capacity of 3,040 for basketball. The most recent appearance of the women's team in the NCAA tournament was in 2021, when it was eliminated 71–63 in the first round by the Kentucky Wildcats. The women's program maintained an active rivalry in basketball with both Idaho and Boise State. In recent years, ISU has dominated UI, but in turn been dominated by BSU. Idaho State's women's basketball team most recently won the 2021 Big Sky Conference women's basketball tournament, beating their interstate rival Idaho in the final round.

Fight song
"Growl, Bengals, Growl" is the official fight song of the university. It was created in 1948 by Jay Slaughter, Del Slaughter, and John Foreman when Idaho State became a four-year university. The song originated around 1921, attributed to Ralph Hutchinson and James Gardner for the Idaho Technical Institute, where Hutchinson was the athletics directory. Traditions include the football team singing the song after a win.

Lyrics 
Growl, Bengals, growl!

Fight, Bengals, fight!

Gnash your teeth and bare your claws and drive with all your might!

Roar, Bengals, roar, you decide our fate!

Bring the vict'ry home to us, you Bengals of Idaho State!

I... S... U... I, S, U, Fight! ISU Fight! ISU Fight! Go! Go! Go Bengals, Go!

Former sports

Baseball
The baseball program at ISU was discontinued  after the 1974 season, following the Big Sky's decision to drop baseball and four other sports. The Bengals won the southern division in their final season, and met north champion Gonzaga in the best-of-three championship series in Pocatello. The underdog Bengals won the first game 6–4, but then lost a doubleheader delayed by snow, 
Boise State and Idaho dropped their baseball programs six years later in 1980, citing budget

Wrestling
Idaho State won 8 Big Sky titles (1967, 1968, 1969, 1970, 1971, 1972, 1973, 1984) in wrestling, starting with its first in 1967; the sport was dropped by the conference , after the 1987 season.

References

External links
 

 
Baseball teams disestablished in 1974